Alexander Jeffrey Obiri Asamoah Gyimah (born January 16, 1986) is a Ghanaian footballer who plays for Aduana Stars.

Club career
On 7 December 2005 left Berekum Arsenal to sign a two-year contract for Ashanti Gold SC and on 17 January 2009 signed for Asante Kotoko.

On 17 March 2010 the Asante Kotoko attacker and top scorer of the 2008/2009 season, changes with immediate effect to South Korean K-League side Gyeongnam FC. The 24-year-old Ghanaian signed with the Changwon-based club, a one-year loan contract and returned on 3 August 2010 to Asante Kotoko.

On December 1, 2011, ES Sétif announced that they had reached a mutual agreement to terminate Asamoah's contract. He spent just four months at the club, making two appearances. He returned in January 2012 to Ashanti Gold SC, before signing for Aduana Stars im September 2012.

On 12 March 2021, the veteran striker joined Techiman based club, Techiman Eleven Wonders in the Ghana Premier League on a one-year deal.

It will be the second stint with Techiman Eleven Wonders after first joining in 2017 and leaving after 2 seasons [7]

Position
Asamoah played as an attacking midfielder or striker

International career
He earned his first call up for his homeland on 4 December 2008.

Honours
Asante Kotoko
 Ghana Premier League: 2008–09
 Ghana Premier League top scorer with 16 goals: 2008–09

References

External links 
 

1986 births
Living people
Ghanaian footballers
Ghanaian expatriate footballers
Association football forwards
Asante Kotoko S.C. players
Ashanti Gold SC players
Berekum Arsenal players
Gyeongnam FC players
Ghanaian expatriate sportspeople in South Korea
K League 1 players
Expatriate footballers in South Korea
ES Sétif players
Expatriate footballers in Algeria
Algerian Ligue Professionnelle 1 players
Aduana Stars F.C. players
Ghanaian expatriate sportspeople in Algeria
Ghana Premier League top scorers